In Latin and Greek poetry, correption ("a shortening")  is the shortening of a long vowel at the end of one word before a vowel at the beginning of the next.  Vowels next to each other in neighboring words are in hiatus.

Homer uses correption in dactylic hexameter:

 — Odyssey 
 Tell me, O Muse, of the man of many devices, who wandered fullmany ways after he had sacked the sacred citadel of Troy.— translation by A.T. Murray

Here the sequence η ε in bold must be pronounced as ε ε to preserve the long—short—short syllable weight sequence of a dactyl. Thus, the scansion of the second line is thus:

  |   |  |   |  |

Attic

Typically, in Homeric meter, a syllable is scanned long or "closed" when a vowel is followed by two or more consonants. However, in Attic Greek, a short vowel followed by a plosive and a liquid consonant or nasal stop remains a short or "open" syllable.  This is called Attic correption, sometime known by its Latin name correptio Attica.

Therefore, the first syllable of a word like δᾰ́κρυ could be scanned as "δά | κρυ" (open/short), exhibiting Attic correption, or as "δάκ | ρυ" (closed/long), in keeping with the conventions of Homeric verse.

See also
 Metaplasm
 Hiatus
 Synalepha

References

Phonology
Figures of speech
Poetic rhythm
Homeric Greek